Kultur Shock is a Seattle-based gypsy punk band which specializes in mixing music like rock, metal and punk with traditional Balkan music.

Biography
Active since 1996, Kultur Shock combines Balkan folk music with punk, metal and art rock. Its members hail from Bosnia, Bulgaria, and the United States. The band has issued as many as 11 albums and had performed over 1,500 shows throughout the United States and Europe. Kultur Shock was signed to Bill Gould's KoolArrow record label from 2001 to 2006 and released three albums for the label: FUCC the INS, Kultura-Diktatura and We Came to Take Your Jobs Away. In 2006 the band formed its own label Kultur Shock Records and publishing company, Kultur Shock Music.

In 2011, the band had attended Motovun Film Festival along with Pips, Chips & Videoclips band and performer Nick Cave.

In 2014, Kultur Shock released IX their ninth album and sixth collaboration with engineer/producer Jack Endino.

The band defines itself as "a live band of blue-collar immigrants".

Current lineup
Gino Srdjan Yevdjevich (Sarajevo, Bosnia and Herzegovina) – vocals, trumpet, tarabuka
Val Kiossovski (Sofia, Bulgaria) – guitar, vocal
Matty Noble (USA) – violin, vocals
Chris Stromquist (Brooklyn, NY) – drums
Guy Michael Davis (Jakarta, Indonesia) – bass
Amy Denio (Detroit, Michigan) – clarinet, saxophone, vocals

Chris Stromquist
Chris Stromquist (5 March 1973) is an American drummer and member of Kultur Shock, the Brooklyn Balkan brass band Slavic Soul Party. and the New York avante-garde Salsa band Zemog El Gallo Bueno.

Discography
Live in Amerika (1999), Pacific Records
FUCC the I.N.S. (2001), Koolarrow Records
Kultura-Diktatura (2004), Koolarrow Records
We Came to Take Your Jobs Away (2006), Koolarrow Records
Live in Europe (2008), Kultur Shock Records
Integration (2009), Kultur Shock Records
Ministry of Kultur (2011), Kultur Shock Records
Tales of Grandpa Guru, Vol. 1 (2012), Kultur Shock Records
IX (2014), Kultur Shock Records
Live at Home (2015), Kultur Shock Records
Tales of the Two Gurus, Vol. 2 (2016), Kultur Shock Records (with Edo Maajka)
D.R.E.A.M (2019)

References

External links
Official Web Site
Band's page on Koolarrow Records site
Kultur Shock, Osijek (5.12.2009.) - photo gallery
Kultur Shock at Maymunarnika (09.08.2016) - Photo gallery
"Kultur Shock – Artisti — MTV Hrvatska  accessdate=2013-08-25.

Chris Stromquist links

"Chris Stromquist @ARTISTdirect" accessdate=2013-08-25
Chris Stromquist Discography and Music at CD Universe accessdate=2013-08-25

Gypsy punk groups
Musical groups established in 1996
Musical groups from Seattle
Punk rock groups from Washington (state)